Kadiatou Camara (born 4 May 1981 in Ségou) is a retired Malian sprinter who specialized in the 200 metres. She formerly competed in the long jump.

Competition record

Personal bests
60 metres – 7.35 s (2003, indoor)
100 metres – 11.48 s (2005)
200 metres – 22.70 s (2008) 
Long jump – 6.53 m (2003)
Triple jump – 12.90 m (2004)

External links

1981 births
Living people
People from Ségou
Malian female sprinters
Female long jumpers
Malian long jumpers
Athletes (track and field) at the 2000 Summer Olympics
Athletes (track and field) at the 2004 Summer Olympics
Athletes (track and field) at the 2008 Summer Olympics
Olympic athletes of Mali
African Games competitors for Mali
Athletes (track and field) at the 1999 All-Africa Games
Athletes (track and field) at the 2003 All-Africa Games
21st-century Malian people